The Gungahlin Cemetery is a major cemetery in Canberra, the capital of Australia. It is located in Mitchell, Australian Capital Territory.

The cemetery opened in 1979.

It includes a natural burial ground and an aboriginal lawn.

Notable burials
 Diane Barwick anthropologist, historian
 Vice Admiral Henry Burrell
 Maisie Carr botanist
 Charles and Lee-Lee Chan parents of actor/director Jackie Chan
 Sir Edwin William "Ted" Hicks CBE public servant
 Sir Edwin McCarthy CBE public servant
 Gunther E. Rothenberg military historian
 Vic Skermer CBE public servant
 Alan Woods AC public servant

References 

Cemeteries in the Australian Capital Territory
Landmarks in Canberra